Victor Klein (25 June 1889 – 27 October 1969) was a Danish footballer. He played in five matches for the Denmark national football team from 1915 to 1917.

References

External links
 

1889 births
1969 deaths
Danish men's footballers
Denmark international footballers
Place of birth missing
Association footballers not categorized by position